A cockle is an edible marine bivalve mollusc. Although many small edible bivalves are loosely called cockles, true cockles are species in the family Cardiidae. 

True cockles live in sandy, sheltered beaches throughout the world. The distinctive rounded shells are bilaterally symmetrical, and are heart-shaped when viewed from the end. Numerous radial, evenly spaced ribs are a feature of the shell in most but not all genera (for an exception, see the genus Laevicardium, the egg cockles, which have very smooth shells).

The shell of a cockle is able to close completely (i.e., there is no "gap" at any point around the edge).  Though the shell of a cockle may superficially resemble that of a scallop because of the ribs, cockles can be distinguished from scallops morphologically in that cockle shells lack "auricles" (triangular ear-shaped protrusions near the hinge line) and scallop shells lack a pallial sinus.  Behaviorally, cockles live buried in sediment, whereas scallops either are free-living and will swim into the water column to avoid a predator, or in some cases live attached  by a byssus to a substrate.

The mantle has three apertures (inhalant, exhalant, and pedal) for siphoning water and for the foot to protrude.  Cockles typically burrow using the foot, and feed by filtering plankton from the surrounding water. Cockles are capable of "jumping" by bending and straightening the foot. As is the case in many bivalves, cockles display gonochorism (the sex of an individual varies according to conditions), and some species reach maturity rapidly.

The common name "cockle" is also given by seafood sellers to a number of other small, edible marine bivalves which have a somewhat similar shape and sculpture, but are in other families such as the Veneridae (Venus clams) and the ark clams (Arcidae). Cockles in the family Cardiidae are sometimes referred to as "true cockles" to distinguish them from these other species.

Species
There are more than 205 living species of cockles, with many more fossil forms.

The common cockle, (Cerastoderma edule), is widely distributed around the coastlines of Northern Europe, with a range extending west to Ireland, the Barents Sea in the north, Norway in the east, and as far south as Senegal.

The dog cockle, Glycymeris glycymeris, has a similar range and habitat to the common cockle, but is not at all closely related, being in the family Glycymerididae. The dog cockle is edible, but due to its toughness when cooked it is generally not eaten, although a process is being developed to solve this problem.

The blood cockle, Tegillarca granosa (not related to the true cockles, instead in the ark clam family, Arcidae) is extensively cultured from southern Korea to Malaysia.

Genera
Genera within the family Cardiidae include:

 Acanthocardia Gray, 1851
 † Acobaecardium Paramonova, 1986 
 Acrosterigma Dall, 1900
 Adacna Eichwald, 1838
 Afrocardium Tomlin, 1931
 † Agnocardia Stewart, 1930 
 † Aktschagylocardium Danukalova, 1996 
 Americardia Stewart, 1930
 † Andrusovicardium Paramonova, 1986
 † Anechinocardium Hickman, 2015 
 Apiocardia Olsson, 1961
 † Apscheronia Andrusov, 1903 
 † Arcicardium P. Fischer, 1887 
 † Arpadicardium Eberzin, 1947 
 † Austrocardium Freneix & Grant-Mackie, 1978
 † Avicardium V. P. Kolesnikov, 1950 
 † Avicularium Gray, 1853 
 † Aviculocardium Bagdasarian, 1978
 † Bosphoricardium Eberzin, 1947 
 Bucardium Gray, 1853
 † Budmania Brusina, 1897
 † Byssocardium Tournouër, 1882 
 † Caladacna Andrusov, 1917 
 Cardium Linnaeus, 1758
 † Caspicardium Astaf'yeva, 1955 
 Cerastoderma Poli, 1795
 † Chartoconcha Andrusov, 1907 
 † Chokrakia S. V. Popov, 2001 
 Ciliatocardium Kafanov, 1974
 Clinocardium Keen, 1936
 Corculum Röding, 1798
 Ctenocardia H. Adams & A. Adams, 1857
 † Dacicardium Papaianopol, 1975 
 Dallocardia Stewart, 1930
 Didacna Eichwald, 1838
 † Didacnoides Astaf'yeva, 1960 
 † Didacnomya Andrusov, 1923 (uncertain, unassessed)
 † Digressodacna Davitashvili & Kitovani, 1964 
 Dinocardium Dall, 1900
 Discors Deshayes, 1858
 † Diversicostata Vassoevich & Eberzin, 1930 
 † Ecericardium Eberzin, 1947 
 † Eoprosodacna Davitashvili, 1934 
 † Ethmocardium White, 1880
 Europicardium Popov, 1977
 † Euxinicardium Eberzin, 1947 
 Fragum Röding, 1798
 Freneixicardia J. A. Schneider, 2002
 Frigidocardium Habe, 1951
 Fulvia Gray, 1853
 † Gilletella Marinescu, 1973 
 Glans Megerle von Mühlfeld, 1811
 Goethemia Lambiotte, 1979
 † Goniocardium Vasseur, 1880 
 † Granocardium Gabb, 1869 
 † Habecardium Glibert & van de Poel, 1970
 † Hedecardium Marwick, 1944
 † Hellenicardium S. V. Popov & Nevesskaja, 2000
 Hippopus Lamarck, 1799
 † Horiodacna Stefanescu, 1896 
 Hypanis Pander in Menetries, 1832
 † Integricardium Rollier, 1912 
 Keenaea Habe, 1951
 Keenocardium Kafanov, 1974
 † Korobkoviella Merklin, 1974 
 † Kubanocardium Muskhelishvili, 1965 
 Laevicardium Swainson, 1840
 † Lahillia Cossmann, 1899 
 † Limnodacna Eberzin, 1936 
 † Limnopagetia Schlickum, 1963
 † Limnopappia Schlickum, 1962 
 Lophocardiium P. Fischer, 1887
 † Loxocardium Cossmann, 1886 
 Lunulicardia Gray, 1853
 † Luxuridacna Papaianopol, 1980 
 † Lymnocardium Stoliczka, 1870 
 Lyrocardium Meek, 1876
 Maoricardium Marwick, 1944
 † Merklinicardium S. V. Popov, 1982  (uncertain, unassessed)
 † Metadacna Eberzin, 1959 
 Microcardium Keen, 1937
 Microfragum Habe, 1951
 † Miricardium Paramonova, 1986 
 Monodacna Eichwald, 1838
 † Moquicardium Eberzin, 1947 
 † Myocardia Vest, 1861  (uncertain, unassessed)
 † Nargicardium Eberzin, 1947
 Nemocardium Meek, 1876
 † Obsoletiformes Kojumdgieva, 1969
 † Omanidacna Harzhauser & Mandic, 2008 
 † Oraphocardium Eberzin, 1949 
 † Orthocardium Tremlett, 1950 
 † Oxydacna Davitashvili, 1930 
 † Pachydacna Eberzin, 1955 
 † Pannonicardium Stevanović, 1951 
 † Panticapaea Andrusov, 1923 
 Papillicardium Sacco, 1899
 Papyridea Swainson, 1840
 † Papyrocardium Gabuniya, 1953  (uncertain, unassessed)
 † Paradacna Andrusov, 1909 
 † Parapscheronia Eberzin, 1955 
 Parvicardium Monterosato, 1884
 † Parvidacna Stevanović, 1950 
 † Phyllocardium P. Fischer, 1887 
 † Plagiocardium Cossmann, 1886 
 † Plagiodacna Andrusov, 1903 
 † Plagiodacnopsis Andrusov, 1923 
 † Planacardium Paramonova, 1971 
 † Plicatiformes Kojumdgieva, 1969 
 † Pontalmyra Stefanescu, 1896 
 Pratulum Iredale, 1924
 † Prionopleura Eberzin, 1949
 Procardium ter Poorten & La Perna, 2017
 † Prophyllicardium Jekelius, 1944  (uncertain, unassessed)
 † Prosochiasta Eberzin, 1959 
 † Prosodacna Tournouër, 1882 
 † Prosodacnomya Eberzin, 1959 
 † Protocardia Beyrich, 1845 
 † Protoplagiodacna Stevanović, 1978
 † Pseudocatillus Andrusov, 1903 
 Pseudofulvia Vidal & Kirkendale, 2007
 † Pteradacna Andrusov, 1907 
 † Raricardium Paramonova, 1986 
 † Replidacna Jekelius, 1944 
 Ringicardium
 † Schedocardia Stewart, 1930 
 † Schirvanicardium Andreescu, 1974 
 Serripes Gould, 1841
 † Stylodacna Stefanescu, 1896 
 † Submonodacna Livental, 1931 
 † Tauricardium Eberzin, 1947 
 Trachycardium Mörch, 1853
 Tridacna  Bruguière, 1797, the "giant clams"
 † Tschaudia Davitashvili & Kitovani, 1964
 † Turcmena G. I. Popov, 1956 
 Trigoniocardium
 Vasticardium Iredale, 1927
 Vepricardium Iredale, 1929
 † Uniocardium Capellini, 1880  (uncertain, unassessed)
 † Yokoyamaina Hayami, 1958 
 † Zamphiridacna Motaş, 1974

Gallery

In cuisine and culture
Cockles are a popular type of edible shellfish in both Eastern and Western cooking.  Cockles are a nutritious seafood item that is high in protein and low in fat. They also contain several essential minerals, including iron and calcium. Cockles are a good source of omega-3 fatty acids, which are beneficial for maintaining heart health. They are collected by raking them from the sands at low tide. However, collecting cockles is hard work and, as seen from the Morecambe Bay disaster, in which 23 people died, can be dangerous if local tidal conditions are not carefully watched.

In England and Wales, people are permitted to collect 5 kg of cockles for personal use. Those wishing to collect more than this are deemed to be engaging in commercial fishing and are required to obtain a permit from the Inshore Fisheries and Conservation Authority.

Cockles are a street food in Cambodia where it is usually steamed or boiled and served with a dipping sauce consisting of crushed peppercorns, salt and lime juice.

Cockles are sold freshly cooked as a snack in the United Kingdom, particularly in those parts of the British coastline where cockles are abundant.  Boiled, then seasoned with malt vinegar and white pepper, they can be bought from seafood stalls, which also often have for sale mussels, whelks, jellied eels, crabs and shrimp.  Cockles are also available pickled in jars, and more recently, have been sold in sealed packets (with vinegar) containing a plastic two-pronged fork.  A meal of cockles fried with bacon, served with laverbread, is known as a traditional Welsh breakfast.

Boiled cockles (sometimes grilled) are sold at many hawker centres in Southeast Asia, and are used in laksa, char kway teow and steamboat. They are called kerang in Malay and see hum in Cantonese.

In Japan, the Japanese egg cockle (Laevicardium laevigatum) is used to create torigai sushi.

A study conducted in England in the early 1980s showed a correlation between the consumption of cockles, presumed to be incorrectly processed, and an elevated local occurrence of hepatitis.

Cockles are an effective bait for a wide variety of sea fishes. The folk song "Molly Malone" is also known as "Cockles and Mussels" because the title character's sale of the two foods is referred to in the song's refrain. The shells of cockles are mentioned in the English nursery rhyme "Mary, Mary, Quite Contrary". Cockles are also eaten by the indigenous peoples of North America.

Alternative meanings
The common English phrase "it warms the cockles of my heart", is used to mean that a feeling of deep-seated contentment has been generated.

Differing derivations of this phrase have been proposed, either directly from the perceived heart-shape of a cockleshell, or indirectly (the scientific name for the type genus of the family is Cardium, from the Latin for heart), or from the Latin diminutive of the word heart, corculum. Another proposed derivation is from the Latin for the ventricles of the heart, cochleae cordis, where the second word is an inflected form of cor, heart, while cochlea is the Latin for snail.

References

External links

 
 Cockles
 Nutrition Facts for Cockles
 
 Poorten, J.J. ter, 2005. Outline of a systematic index - Recent Cardiidae (Lamarck, 1809). VISAYA net. (Updated 2009 for WoRMS)

 
Commercial molluscs
Seafood in Native American cuisine
Street food
Welsh cuisine
British seafood dishes